Mannose-binding lectin-associated protein of 44 kDa (MAp44) is a protein arising from the human MASP1 gene. MASP-1, MASP-3 and MAp44 are alternative splice products of the MASP1 gene. MAp44 has been suggested to act as a competitive inhibitor of lectin pathway activation, by displacing MASP-2 from MBL, hence preventing cleavage of C4 and C2

See also 
 mannan-binding lectin
 lectin pathway

References

External links 
 

Complement system